

Nizhnyaya Toyma is a rural locality (a village) in Vyatskopolyansky District of Kirov Oblast, Russia.

In 1913, the village belonged to Malmyzhsky Uyezd of Vyatka Governorate, Russian Empire.

References

Notes

Sources

Rural localities in Kirov Oblast